Stefana Fratila is a Romanian-Canadian artist, composer, and sound effects editor, who was a winner of the Canadian Screen Award for Best Sound Editing at the 10th Canadian Screen Awards in 2022 for Scarborough.

References

External links

Canadian sound artists
Women sound artists
Canadian women composers
Canadian sound editors
Women sound editors
Best Sound Editing Genie and Canadian Screen Award winners
Living people
Year of birth missing (living people)